Pleurotus djamor, commonly known as the pink oyster mushroom, is a species of fungus in the family Pleurotaceae. It was originally named Agaricus djamor by the German-born botanist Georg Eberhard Rumphius and sanctioned under that name by Elias Magnus Fries in 1821. It was known by many different names before being transferred to the genus Pleurotus by Karel Bernard Boedijn in 1959.

Properties
The flavor of the pink oyster mushroom has been described as meaty and fishy. Just like most mushrooms it is quite umami. Its texture is both meaty and chewy. When fried until crispy, it resembles bacon or even ham. However, when it is raw, it has a sour taste.

The pink oyster mushroom, unsurprisingly, has a pink color.  It has a curly cap which is 2 – 5 cm in diameter. The caps are also quite thin. The stem is very short or even non existent.

The reason why it is very rare to find in supermarkets is that it has a shelf life of only about a day. Since it is only harvested from spring to fall, it is only available during that time.

Uses
Pink oyster mushrooms are best suited for cooked applications such as sautéing, boiling, roasting, or frying. They can be sautéed or stir-fried with other vegetables, added to pasta dishes, sprinkled on top of pizza, added to grain bowls, sautéed with eggs, boiled in soups, chowders, or stews, or cooked into risotto. They can also be sautéed and mixed with cream-based white sauces for added flavor. Due to their meaty texture, these mushrooms require thorough cooking to develop their flavor and an edible consistency.  Pink oyster mushrooms pair well with coriander, parsley, mint, basil, garlic, ginger, onion, sesame oil, soy sauce, bell pepper, red cabbage, broccolini, baby corn, leeks, quinoa, noodles, rice, and potatoes.

In culture
Pink oyster mushrooms are a commonly found specimen in central Mexican communities. It is the most well known mushroom in Tlayacapan, Morelos, with 98.8% of surveyed locals being able to identify it. There, It has been recorded as being able to grow from May to November. The species is collected by families and then often sold at vendors markets. Locals call it a variety of names: "seta", "cazahuate", "orejón", "hongo de pino", "blanco", "oreja de cazahuate".

See also
List of Pleurotus species

References

External links

Edible fungi
Fungi described in 1821
Pleurotaceae